Foxy Ladies Love Boogie 70's Explosion is an 85-minute revue that traces cultural and political changes concerning women in the 1970s, through a selection of 43 songs from pop, rock, folk and disco music and TV theme songs of that era. It was performed for at least 7 months in 1999–2000 at Duplex Cabaret Theatre, 61 Christopher Street in Greenwich Village.

Premise
The show incorporates 43 songs and 46 costume changes as it pays tribute to such female musical legends such as Joni Mitchell, Cher, Patti Smith, Donna Summer and Barbra Streisand.

Songs include "The First Time Ever I Saw Your Face," "Higher and Higher," "You're So Vain," "Love Will Keep Us Together," "Dancing Queen," "Lovin' You," "I Will Survive," "Evergreen," "I Feel the Earth Move," "I Love the Nightlife," and "We Are Family."

Emmy nominee Fritz Brekeller created and directed the revue. The musical director was Tracy Stark the choreographer was Ashley Wren Collins, and the costume designer was DeWayne Kirchner.

Cast
Maggie Anderson
Marie La Ferrara
Bethany Joy Lenz
Anne Lauterbach
Abigail Spencer
Jen Ward

Source: Playbill

References 

Revues